Go Down Records is an independent record label based in Treviso, Italy. It was founded by Leonardo Cola and Max Ear (drummer of the rock bands OJM and Ananda Mida) in 2003 and the headquarters were in Savignano sul Rubicone up to 2019.

History
Go Down Records started in 2003. The first release was Play at High Level by Italian hard-rock band Small Jackets in 2004, followed by The Light Album by Italian stoner band OJM. Then the record label grew, involving many other artists of the independent music scene such as ALiX, Veracrash, Deadpeach and so on.

Since its foundation, the label's mission has been to support the independent music scene and in particular stoner rock, garage rock and rock'n'roll genres.

Today, Go Down Records is one of the most important Italian and international rock record labels. So far, it has released almost two hundred albums by various artists: Karma To Burn, Vibravoid, Fatso Jetson, OJM, The Fuzztones, The Morlocks, Link Protrudi and the Jaymen, Solrize, Dome La Muerte and the Diggers, Rock'n’Roll Kamikazes, The Hormonauts, Small Jackets, Gunash, among others.

Go Down Records, inspired from the sounds of the 1960s and 1970s, doesn't produce only digital music but also physical formats such as vinyl records and CDs.

The Go Down Studio, active in Savignano sul Rubicone from 2011 to 2018, was a professional recording studio headed by sound engineer Alfredo 'Epi' Gentili and managed by Marcello Piastra.

Artists
List of Go Down Record's bands:

 Alice Tambourine Lover
 ALiX
 Bleeding Eyes
 Bones & Comfort
 Clepsydra
 Cut
 Deadpeach
 Dome La Muerte and the Diggers
 Douge
 El Thule
 Elbow Strike
 Electric 69
 Elepharmers
 Frigidaire Tango
 Glincolti
 Gorilla
 Grand Sound Heroes
 Gunash feat. Rami Jaffee
 Horrible Porno Stuntmen
 Humulus
 Jack La Motta And Your Bones
 Jahbulong
 Kani
 Last Killers
 Les Bondage
 Link Protrudi & The Jaymen
 Lord Shani
 Los Fuocos
 Lu Silver & String Band (ex Small Jackets)
 Mad Penguins
 Maya Mountains
 Muffx
 Muzzled
 Not Moving
 OJM
 Pater Nembrot
 Poison Deluxe
 Re Dinamite
 Slick Steve and the Gangsters
 Small Jackets
 Solrize
 Supertempo
 T.H.U.M.B.
 The Astrophonix
 The Barbacans
 The Brain Washing Machine
 The Clamps
 The Fuzztones
 The Hormonauts
 The Morlocks
 The Rock'n'roll Kamikazes
 The Sade
 The Shoes
 The Strange Flowers
 The Vindicators
 Three Eyes Left
 Underdogs
 Veracrash
 Vibravoid
 Vic Du Montes's Persona Non Grata
 Volcano Heat
 Yawning Man

Distribution Shop:

 3 Mexicans From Gorma
 Autumn's Rain
 Belfast
 Black Dago
 Bodyntime
 Bones & Comfort
 D.O.A.
 Fango
 Fuck Knights
 Herbamate
 Hormonas
 I Ciuffis
 King Howl Quartet
 King Size
 Los Explosivos
 Love In Elevator
 Loveland
 Manta Rays
 Maya Galattici
 Mondo Naif
 Mr Bison
 Mr Soul
 Perro Malo
 Quiet Confusion
 Sendelica
 The Bermudas
 The Bone Machine
 The Fastback
 The Peawees
 The Vindicators
 Thee Catacombs
 Using Bridge
 Volcano Heat
 Whartey

References

External links
 Official Website
 Facebook
 Instagram
 YouTube Channel
 Bandcamp
 Twitter
 Discogs
 MySpace
 Last Fm Page

Record labels established in 2003
Italian independent record labels
Indie rock record labels
Italian companies established in 2003